Danse mot vår (lit.: Dancing towards spring) is a song written and composed by Rolf Løvland and Britt Viberg. It was originally recorded by Elisabeth Andreassen on her 1992 album Stemninger. She scored a late 1992 Norsktoppen hit with the song. 

Secret Garden' recorded an instrumental version, entitled "Serenade to Spring", on their 1995 debut album Songs from a Secret Garden. The song is available with Korean lyrics, as well.

References

Norwegian songs
1992 songs
Songs written by Rolf Løvland
Norwegian-language songs